The 2003 Spanish Grand Prix (formally the XLV Gran Premio Marlboro de España) was a Formula One motor race held on 4 May 2003 at the Circuit de Catalunya in Montmeló, Spain. It was the fifth round of the 2003 Formula One season and the forty-fifth Spanish Grand Prix, and also the last held on this layout. The 65-lap race was won by Michael Schumacher in a Ferrari car after starting from pole position. Ferrari debuted their new car, the F2003-GA at this race. GA was added to the cars name as a tribute to Gianni Agnelli, head of Fiat, who died shortly before the car's unveiling. Fernando Alonso finished second driving for the Renault team with Rubens Barrichello third in the other Ferrari.

Classification

Qualifying 
The slowest time across both sessions indicated the time used to determine the qualifying order. These times are shown in bold.

Race

Championship standings after the race 

Drivers' Championship standings

Constructors' Championship standings

Note: Only the top five positions are included for both sets of standings.

References

External links
 BBC Sport race report

Spanish Grand Prix
Spanish Grand Prix
Grand Prix
Spanish Grand Prix